The A115 autoroute is a motorway in Île-de-France in France.

History

The motorway first linked Sannois to Beauchamp then Taverny in 2000 by a 1 km long tunnel. The last part of the motorway was opened in September 2004, linking Taverny to Méry-sur-Oise and thus linking the RN 184 to the A15.

List of junctions

External links

Autoroute A115 in Saratlas

A115